is a Japanese politician who served as Prime Minister of Japan from 1994 to 1996. He led the Japanese Socialist Party, and was responsible for changing its name to the Social Democratic Party of Japan in 1996. Upon becoming Prime Minister, he was Japan's first socialist leader in nearly fifty years. He is most remembered today for his speech "On the occasion of the 50th anniversary of the War's end", in which he publicly apologised for Imperial Japanese atrocities committed during World War II. Of the ten living former prime ministers of Japan, he is currently the oldest living prime minister, following the death of Yasuhiro Nakasone on 29 November 2019. Murayama is also the only living former Japanese prime minister who was born in the Taishō era.

Early life and education

Murayama was born in Ōita Prefecture on 3 March 1924; his father was a fisherman. He entered Meiji University in 1943 as a philosophy student, but was mobilised in 1944 and assigned to work in the Ishikawajima shipyards. Later that year, he was drafted into the Imperial Army and assigned to the 72nd Infantry of the 23rd Brigade of the 23rd Division as a private second class. He was demobilised following Japan's surrender with the rank of officer candidate. Following the death of Yasuhiro Nakasone in 2019, Murayama is the only living former prime minister with military service connected to the war.

Career
Murayama was appointed secretary of the labor union in his company and entered the Japan Socialist Party, which his union supported. He began his political career as a member of the Ōita city council in 1955 and went on to serve three terms. In 1963, his supporters urged him to be a candidate for the Ōita prefectural assembly. He was elected three times successively. In 1972, he was elected to the House of Representatives of Japan.

In 1991, Murayama was appointed chairman of the Diet Affairs Committee of his party.
In August 1993, after the general election, the Japan Socialist Party joined the cabinet until 1994. In October of the same year, he was elected the head of the party.

Prime minister

Murayama became prime minister on 30 June 1994. The cabinet was based on a coalition consisting of the Japan Socialist Party, the Liberal Democratic Party, and the New Party Sakigake.

Because of the unwieldy coalition, his leadership was not strong. His party had been opposed to the Security Pact between Japan and the United States, but he stated that this pact was in accordance with the Constitution of Japan and disappointed many of his Socialist supporters. His government was criticised for not dealing quickly with the Great Hanshin earthquake that hit Japan on 17 January 1995. Just two months later on 20 March, the Aum Shinrikyo cult carried out the Sarin gas attack on the Tokyo subway.

As the prime minister, Murayama apologised for the atrocities committed by Japan during World War II. In social policy, various reforms were carried out in areas such as labour rights, care for the elderly, child support, and assistance for people with disabilities. In 1995, a law on family-care leave was introduced which made it mandatory for employers to grant a maximum of three consecutive months leave to male and female employees who need to take constant care of a family member, and prohibited employers from dismissing employees for taking family-care leave. Safety standards concerning mobile cranes were established in 1995, and amendments made to the Radiation Safety Law of 1960 and the Radiation Safety Law of 1957 in 1995 extended coverage to previously excluded rental business workers, rental business offices, and rental businesses. Amendments made to the Radiation Hindrance Prevention Law of 1957 in 1995 extended the law to cover rental business workers, rental business offices, and rental businesses. In July 1995, a law came into effect that imposed strict liability, or liability without fault, upon manufacturers and importers of defective products. The Food Sanitation Law of 1995 introduced a comprehensive food safety system. In 1995, an amendment to the Firearm and Sword Possession Control Law made gun possession a more serious offence, and the Science and Technology Basic Law passed that same year provided the framework of Japan's science and technology policy.

In 1995, the Mental Health Act was revised to improve psychiatric and medical treatment and psychiatric rehabilitation "and to ensure coordination among the mental health system and other health, social service, and administrative sectors". The Container and Package Recycling Law of 1995 prescribed "obligatory duties of business parties for recycling containers and packaging," while a 1995 amendment to the Mental Health Law introduced a system to provide a health and welfare handbook for people with mental disorders, and a Government Action Plan for Persons with Disabilities was launched that same year. In addition, new comprehensive employment measures were introduced.

In the 1995 Japanese House of Councillors election, his party lost seats. He expressed his wish to resign from the office of prime minister, but his supporters opposed his resignation. A few months later, he resigned and was replaced by Ryutaro Hashimoto, the head of the Liberal Democratic Party.

After politics

In 2000, he retired from politics. Murayama and Mutsuko Miki traveled to North Korea in 2000 to promote better bilateral relations between the two countries.

He became the president of the Asian Women's Fund, a quasi-government body that was set up to provide compensation for former comfort women. After providing compensation and working on various projects, the fund was dissolved on 31 March 2007.

Honours

Grand Cordon of the Order of the Paulownia Flowers (2006)

See also

 Resolution to renew the determination for peace on the basis of lessons learned from history
 Murayama Cabinet
 The Nobel Peace Prize for Article 9 of the Japanese Constitution

References

External links

|-

|-

|-

1924 births
Living people
20th-century prime ministers of Japan
People from Ōita (city)
Meiji University alumni
Members of the House of Representatives (Japan)
Prime Ministers of Japan
Social Democratic Party (Japan) politicians
20th-century Japanese politicians
People from Ōita Prefecture
Politicians from Ōita Prefecture
Imperial Japanese Army personnel of World War II
Imperial Japanese Army officers